The Play the King Stakes is a Canadian Thoroughbred horse race run annually at Woodbine Racetrack in Toronto, Ontario. A Grade II sprint race, it is open to horses age three and older and is run over a distance of seven furlongs on turf. It currently offers a purse of CAN$200,000.

Inaugurated in 1987 as the Toronto Budweiser Breeders' Cup Handicap, it was competed at a distance of six furlongs on dirt until 1996 when it was shifted to the turf and set at its current distance of seven furlongs. At the same time, the race was renamed in honor of Kinghaven Farms' 1988 Canadian Horse of the Year, Play the King.

The race was run in two divisions in 2000.

Records
Speed  record:
 1:19.77 - Just Rushing (2008) (at current distance of 7 furlongs)
 1:09.20 - Play the King (1987)
 1:09.20 - Apelia (1993)

Most wins:
 2 - Play the King (1987, 1988)
 2 - King Corrie (1991, 1992)
 2 - Soaring Free (2003, 2004)
 2 - Le Cinquieme Essai (2006, 2007)

Most wins by an owner:
 4 - Sam-Son Farm (1997, 1998, 2003, 2004)

Most wins by a jockey:
 3 - Todd Kabel (1995, 2003, 2004)

Most wins by a trainer:
 4 - Sid C. Attard (2008, 2009, 2010, 2016)
 4 - Mark Frostad (1997, 1998, 2003, 2004)

Winners of the Play The King Stakes

See also
 List of Canadian flat horse races

References

 The Play The King Stakes at Pedigree Query

Graded stakes races in Canada
Open mile category horse races
Recurring events established in 1987
Woodbine Racetrack